
Year 606 (DCVI) was a common year starting on Saturday (link will display the full calendar) of the Julian calendar. The denomination 606 for this year has been used since the early medieval period, when the Anno Domini calendar era became the prevalent method in Europe for naming years.

Events 
 By place 
 Europe 
 Queen Brunhilda pressures her grandson Theuderic II to go to war against his brother, Theudebert II of Austrasia. She puts Protadius, Mayor of the Palace, in charge of the Burgundian army. At the palace of Quierzy (Picardy), Theuderic assembles his army. The soldiers under Uncelen, Duke of Alemannia, refuse to fight against their countrymen, and declare that the king orders Protadius' death. He is killed by the Frankish warriors, and Theuderic is forced to sign a peace treaty.

 Britain 

 Cearl succeeds Pybba as king of Mercia (English Midlands).

 Asia 
 King Harsha of Thanesar establishes a northern Indian Empire, and unites the small monarchical states, from Punjab to the Indus Valley (modern Pakistan).
 Shashanka is the first recorded independent king of Bengal. He establishes his capital in modern-day Murshidabad (approximate date).

 By topic 
 Religion 
 February 22 – Sabinian dies at Rome after a two-year reign, and will not be replaced until 607.
 The diocese of Aquileia becomes a patriarchate (approximate date).

Births 
 Hafsa bint Umar, daughter of Umar and wife of Muhammad
 Han Yuan, chancellor of the Tang Dynasty (d. 659)

Deaths 
 February 22 – Pope Sabinian
 Colmán of Cloyne, Irish monk and poet
 Cyriacus II, patriarch of Constantinople
 Jianzhi Sengcan, patriarch of Chán
 John Climacus, monk and writer
 Paterius, bishop of Brescia (Italy)
 Protadius, Mayor of the Palace (Burgundy)
 Pybba, king of Mercia (approximate date)
 Yang Su, general of the Sui Dynasty
 Yang Zhao, prince of the Sui Dynasty (b. 584)

References